Jaime Cruells (11 April 1906 – 21 July 1968) was a Spanish water polo player. He competed at the 1924 Summer Olympics and the 1928 Summer Olympics.

See also
 Spain men's Olympic water polo team records and statistics
 List of men's Olympic water polo tournament goalkeepers

References

External links
 

1906 births
1968 deaths
Water polo players from Barcelona
Spanish male water polo players
Water polo goalkeepers
Olympic water polo players of Spain
Water polo players at the 1924 Summer Olympics
Water polo players at the 1928 Summer Olympics
20th-century Spanish people